Tacabro is an Italian dance music trio from Catania (Sicily), Italy, initially made up of Italian DJs and record producers Mario Romano and Salvatore "Salvo" Sapienza, and later also of Cuban singer Martínez Rodríguez, better known as Ruly MC.

Mario Romano and Salvo Sapienza started working in Italian night club as DJs, and in the spring of 2008 they formed the duo known as Romano & Sapienza playing mostly electro/tribal sounds. Their first break as Romano & Sapienza was with their first single "Judas Brass", released in 2008 by Hollister Records.

However they are best known for the hit "Tacata' ". The single was released in 2011 in Italy credited to "Romano & Sapienza featuring Rodriguez", the latter being the Cuban artist Martínez Rodríguez, known as Ruly MC. Based on this success, the single was released with a new music video under the name "Tacabro" becoming a hit in Denmark where it reached #1, in France where it reached #6 and in Sweden. According to PROMUSICAE, the publisher of the Official Spanish Singles and Albums Charts, "Rayos de sol" was the seventh biggest selling single in Spain in 2012.

In 2015, Mario Romano collaborated with American singer-songwriter Liza Fox and DJ Jus Grata on the single "Unlimited".

Discography

Singles

References

External links
Tacabro Official website
Romano & Sapienza Myspace

Italian DJs
Italian record producers
Italian musical duos
Electronic dance music DJs
Musicians from Catania